Michael Gufler (born 24 March 1979) is a former Italian alpine skier who won the Europa Cup overall title in 2006.

Biography
His best result in the world cup was a 10th place in giant slalom. After his skiing career he began his career as a coach,  in the 2022-23 world cup season he is at the starting line as a technician for the Italian national alpine ski team.

World Cup results
Top 10

Europa Cup results
Gufler has won an overall Europa Cup and one discipline cup.

FIS Alpine Ski Europa Cup
Overall: 2006
Giant slalom: 2006

References

External links
 

1979 births
Living people
Italian male alpine skiers
Italian alpine skiing coaches
Germanophone Italian people
Sportspeople from Merano
20th-century Italian people